Alone with the Blues is a solo album by pianist Red Garland recorded in 1960 and released on the Moodsville label.

Track listing 

 "In the Evening (When the Sun Goes Down)" (Leroy Carr) - 5:24
 "Blues in the Closet" (Oscar Pettiford) - 4:20
 "Chains of Love" (Ahmet Nugetre, Harry Van Walls) - 5:59
 "Tired" (Alan Roberts, Doris Fisher) - 6:35
 "Sent for You Yesterday (And Here You Come Today)" (Count Basie, Jimmy Rushing, Eddie Durham) - 5:06
 "Trane's Blues" (John Coltrane) - 5:49
 "Wee Baby Blues" (Pete Johnson, Big Joe Turner) - 6:56
 "Cloudy" (Mary Lou Williams) - 4:49

Personnel 
 Red Garland - piano

References 

Red Garland albums
1960 albums
Albums recorded at Van Gelder Studio
Moodsville Records albums
Solo piano jazz albums